Delano is an unincorporated community in Polk County, Tennessee, United States. Delano has a post office with ZIP code 37325, which opened on August 14, 1909.

Delano is home to an Old Order Mennonite community, which operates a popular produce market. The Mennonites are under the oversight of the Noah Hoover Old Order Mennonites of Scottsville, Kentucky.

Demographics

References

Unincorporated communities in Polk County, Tennessee
Unincorporated communities in Tennessee